Free: Coming of Age at the End of History is a book by Lea Ypi.

Free was published on 28 October 2021 by Allen Lane. In January 2022, BBC Radio 4 serialised the book in their Book of the Week series.

Reception 
Free was shortlisted for the 2021 Baillie Gifford Prize and the 2021 Costa Book Award for biography.

10,000 copies were sold in the November 2021.

Ed O'Loughlin praised Ypi's use of subtext in the work.

References

External links 

2021 non-fiction books
Allen Lane (imprint) books